The badminton women's singles tournament at the 2012 Olympic Games in London took place from 28 July to 4 August at Wembley Arena.

The draw was held on 23 July 2012. Forty-six players from 42 nations competed.

In an all-Chinese final, Li Xuerui defeated reigning World Number 1 Wang Yihan to win the gold medal. India's Saina Nehwal took bronze after the injury-forced withdrawal of China's Wang Xin. This was the first medal of any colour for India in Olympic badminton.

Competition format

For the first time, the preliminary stage consisted of 16 groups of either two or three players. Each played every other member of the group with the top players advancing to the knock-out stage, ultimately leading to the winner.

Seeds
A Total of 16 Players were given seeds.

  (silver medallist)
  (fourth place)
  (gold medallist)
  (bronze medallist)
  (quarter-finals)
  (round of 16)
  (quarter-finals)
  (group stage)
  (quarter-finals)
  (round of 16)
  (round of 16)
   (round of 16)
  (round of 16)
  (round of 16)
  (group stage)
  (round of 16)

Results

Group stage

Group A

Group B

Group C

Group D

Group E

Group F

Group G

Group H

Group I

Group J

Group K

Group L

Group M

Group N

Group O

Group P

Knockout

References

External links
Results at tournamentsoftware.com

Badminton at the 2012 Summer Olympics
Olymp
Women's events at the 2012 Summer Olympics